The Monastery's Hunter is an 1892 historical novel written by the German novelist Ludwig Ganghofer. It is set in Bavaria in the fourteenth century.

It has been turned into films three times, a 1920 German silent, a 1935 German sound film and a 1953 West German film.

References

Bibliography
 

1892 novels
Novels by Ludwig Ganghofer
German novels adapted into films
Novels set in the 14th century